Mohanlal Sukhadia University also called University of Udaipur is a public university in Udaipur city in the Indian state of Rajasthan.The earlier agricultural university was turned into a multi-faculty university in 1964 and named University of Udaipur. In 1984 it was renamed Mohanlal Sukhadia University in memory of politician Mohanlal Sukhadia. The university has two campuses spread over an area of more than 600 acres of land. Lastly, the university was accredited at "A" Grade by NAAC Bengaluru, with a CGPA of 3.

Affiliated Colleges
It consists of four constituent colleges and around 190 affiliated colleges from the districts of Chittorgarh, Rajsamand, Sirohi and Udaipur.

University departments
 Faculty of Commerce 
 Faculty of humanities
 Faculty of management
 Faculty of Science 
 Faculty of social science

Rankings

See also
Mohanlal Sukhadia

References

External links
 
 MLSU Question Papers

 
Universities in Udaipur
Educational institutions established in 1962
1962 establishments in Rajasthan